The Next Move Handicap is an American Thoroughbred horse race run annually near the end of March at Aqueduct Racetrack in Ozone Park, Queens, New York. A Grade III event open to fillies and Mares, age three and older, it is contested on dirt over a distance of one mile and one furlong. It offers a purse of $100,000.

Inaugurated in 1975, the race was restricted to three-year-old fillies at one mile in 1975. It was contested at a mile and three sixteenths from 1984 through 1994.

The race is named in honor of the filly Next Move who was the American Champion Three-Year-Old Filly of 1950 and the American Co-Champion Older Female Horse in 1952.

Since inception, the Next Move Handicap has been contested at various distances:
 1 mile : 1975 
  miles : 1976–1983, 1995–present
  miles : 1984–1994

On December 4, 2009 the New York Racing Association announced that the Next Move Handicap was being placed on hiatus.

Records
Speed record: (at current distance of  miles)
 1:48.96 – Diggins (1999)

Most wins:
 2 – One Sum (1978, 1979)

Most wins by a jockey:
 4 – Ruben Hernandez (1976, 1978, 1979, 1981)
 4 – Mike Luzzi (1994, 1995, 2007, 2009)

Most wins by a trainer:
 4 – Todd A. Pletcher (2003, 2004, 2006, 2007)

Most wins by an owner:
 2 – Charles T. Wilson Jr. (1978, 1979)
 2 – Nelson Bunker Hunt (1980, 1984)
 2 – H. Joseph Allen (1981, 1982)
 2 – Edward P. Evans (1998, 2002)
 2 – Dogwood Stable (2003, 2004)

Winners

References

Mile category horse races for fillies and mares
Graded stakes races in the United States
Grade 3 stakes races in the United States
Recurring sporting events established in 1975
Aqueduct Racetrack
Horse races in New York City